Ku'urkil is the Chukchi creator-deity, roughly analogous to Bai-Ulgan of the Turkic pantheon. The Koryak refer to him as Quikinna'qu ("Big Raven") and in Kamchadal mythology he is called Kutkhu.

See also 

 Kutkh

Siberian deities
Circumpolar mythology

Chukchi culture
Legendary crows
Creator deities